The Kostrići massacre was the killing 16 Croat civilians (the entire population of the village) in the village of Kostrići, near Hrvatska Kostajnica by Serb paramilitary unit "Kaline Komogovina" on 15 November 1991 during the Croatian War of Independence. Among those killed were two children. The oldest victim was 93 years old.

The Serb paramilitary unit of "Kaline Komogovina", which was led by Stevo Borojević "Gadafi", entered the village from two directions, from Hrvatska Kostajnica and Majur. In one house they found a young woman with two children (aged two and four), whom they asked for her husband, Zlatko Jurić. After being told that he had gone to the neighbouring village Stubalj, the three were killed. The husband reported the crime to Milan Martić's militia (the police force of SAO Krajina) in Kostajnica, and was then killed. The village was looted and burned. Only seven victims were identified. Some victims were found after the war in burned and destroyed homes.

After committing the massacre in Kostrići, the same Serb paramilitary unit massacred another 38 Croat civilians in the nearby villages of Majur, Graboštani and Stubalj.

Two alleged members of the paramilitary unit have been charged with killing five police officers and two civilians in the village Volinja in October 1991.

In 2011 a monument to the victims, with names inscribed, was unveiled in the village.

See also
List of massacres in the Croatian War

References

Sources

Mass murder in 1991
1991 in Croatia
Massacres in 1991
November 1991 events in Europe
Serbian war crimes in the Croatian War of Independence
Massacres in Croatia
Republic of Serbian Krajina
1991 crimes in Croatia
1991 murders in Europe
1990s murders in Croatia
Massacres of Croats
Massacres in the Croatian War of Independence